The Italian and Swiss expedition of 1799 was a military campaign undertaken by a combined Austro-Russian army under overall command of the Russian Marshal Alexander Suvorov against French forces in Piedmont and Lombardy (modern Italy) and the Helvetic Republic (present-day Switzerland). The expedition was part of the Italian campaigns of the French Revolutionary Wars in general, and the War of the Second Coalition in particular. It was one of 'two unprecedented Russian interventions in 1799', the other being the Anglo-Russian invasion of Holland (August–November 1799).

Preparations 

The expedition was primarily planned by British and Russian politicians and diplomats. Russia would provide troops that Britain would subsidise, and together they sought to encourage Austria to do most of the fighting (as it had about three-fourths of the would-be Second Coalition's land forces), pay for its own troops as well as supply the entire allied army, while maintaining Anglo-Russian strategic control over the campaign including Austria's war effort. Russia and especially Britain distrusted Austria because they were suspicious of the Habsburgs' territorial greed; they hoped to coax Austria into entering war with France out of self-defence and to help restore the pre-Revolutionary order in Europe without Austrian territorial expansion. Moreover, London was still in a bitter dispute with Vienna over a loan convention to pay off Austria's debts to Britain, and so it refused to subsidise the Austrian troops as well, even though the Habsburgs had barely recovered from the War of the First Coalition (1792–1797). According to Paul W. Schroeder (1987), Britain and Russia also 'deliberately fostered and exploited' the rivalry between Prussia and Austria to entice both to join the Second Coalition; Berlin would end up retaining its neutrality.

Although by 1799 he was nearly seventy years old, Suvorov was one of the most competent and experienced commanders of the age. He had won no fewer than sixty-three battles in the course of his long military career and had been appointed field marshal during the reign of Catherine the Great, though he was dismissed by Tsar Paul, her son and successor, after the old soldier had the audacity to criticise the new imperial Infantry Code. He was only recalled after the Austrians specifically requested that he be appointed to command the combined Austro-Russian army to fight the French in Italy.

Order of battle

Russian forces 
65,000 Russian troops participated in the expedition. The Russian expeditionary force consisted of three corps.
 The first corps was that of Russian general Alexander Korsakov; it was originally planned to consist of 45,000 troops which were subsidised by Britain, but in the end it comprised only 24,000 soldiers. Korsakov's corps departed from Brest-Litovsk, marching via Opole, the Moravian Gate, Prague, crossing the Danube west of Regensburg, and entering Switzerland in order to confront a French army near Zürich. Its ultimate objective was to invade France through its weakly defended Alpine border.
 The second corps went from Brest-Litovsk via Kraków and Krems to Vienna – where Suvorov joined the troops and assumed overall command – and then across the Brenner Pass via Brescia to Milan (at 1,650 kilometres from Moscow).
 The third corps commanded by Andrei Rosenberg started in Kamianets-Podilskyi, marched via Lviv across the Carpathian Mountains to Budapest, and passed Verona on the way to Turin.

Austrian forces 

Strength: 148,663 (178,253 when garrisons are included) in August 1799

French forces 
 Army of the Danube (2 March – 11 December 1799; merged into the Army of the Rhine on 24 November 1799)
Strength: 25,000 troops (March 1799).
Commander: General Jourdan

 Army of Naples (armée de Naples)
 Army of Italy.
Strength: 53,581 (63,657 when garrisons are included) on 23 September 1799
Commanders:
 12 March – 26 April 1799: General Schérer, as part of his overall command of the Army of Naples 
 27 April – 4 August 1799: General Moreau, as part of his overall command of the Army of Naples
 5–15 August 1799: General Joubert, commander of both the Army of Italy and the Army of the Alps, killed at the battle of Novi
 15 August – 20 September 1799: General Moreau
 21 September – 30 December 1799: General Championnet

 Army of the Alps (created on 27 July 1799, merged into the Army of Italy on 29 August 1799).
Strength: 25,000 troops.
Commander: General Championnet

 Polish Legions
Commander: Jan Henryk Dąbrowski

Italian campaign 

On 27 April, he defeated Jean Victor Moreau at the Battle of Cassano. Soon afterward, Suvorov wrote to a Russian diplomat: "The Adda is a Rubicon, and we crossed it over the bodies of our enemies." On 29 April he entered Milan. Two weeks later, he moved on to Turin, having defeated Moreau yet again at Marengo. The king of Sardinia greeted him as a hero and conferred on him the rank of "Prince of the House of Savoy", among other honors.

From Naples, General MacDonald moved north to assist Moreau in June. Trapped between two armies, Suvorov decided to concentrate his whole force against MacDonald, beating the French at the Trebbia River (19 June). Marching back to the north, Suvorov chased the French Army of Italy as it retreated towards the Riviera, taking the fortified city of Mantua on 28 July.

Moreau was relieved of command, to be replaced by Joubert. Pushing through the Bocchetta Pass, Joubert was defeated and killed in battle with Suvorov at Novi (15 August) to the north of Genoa. Years later when Moreau, who was also present at Novi, was asked about Suvorov, he replied: "What can you say of a general so resolute to a superhuman degree, and who would perish himself and let his army perish to the last man rather than retreat a single pace."

Swiss campaign

In 1798, Paul I gave General Korsakov command of an expeditionary force of 30,000 men sent to Germany to join Austria in the fight against the French Republic. At the beginning of 1799, the force was diverted to drive the French out of Switzerland. Leaving Russia in May, Korsakov reached Stockach in 90 days. With 29,463 men, his command then marched to Zürich to join up with the 25,000-man corps of Austrian general Friedrich von Hotze, who had defeated the French army at the Battle of Winterthur on 27 May 1799. It was expected that Suvorov's army would join them from Italy after marching through the Alps, but terrain and enemy action held up Suvorov's advance. In the meantime, Korsakov waited near Zürich in a relaxed state of over-confidence. Taking full advantage of this, the French under André Masséna attacked on 25 September 1799, winning a decisive victory in the Second Battle of Zürich and forcing Korsakov to withdraw rapidly to Schaffhausen, despite almost no pursuit by the French and orders from Suvorov for him to hold his ground. Korsakov then took up a position on the east of the Rhine in the Dörflingen Camp between Schaffhausen and Constance, remaining there while Masséna was left free to deal with Suvorov. His left under Condé was driven from Constance on 7 October, on the same day he advanced from Büsingen against Schlatt, but was eventually driven back by Masséna, abandoning his hold on the left bank of the Rhine. He joined Suvorov's survivors at Lindau on 18 October, and was shortly after relieved of command.

Outcome 

Suvorov succeeded in rescuing his army 'by a brilliant but costly fighting march across the Alps into eastern Switzerland'. He did not lose a single battle. However, the defeat Korsakov's army at the Second Battle of Zürich proved to be decisive: it destroyed any hopes of invading France and restoring the Bourbon monarchy, and along with the failed Anglo-Russian invasion of Holland, and rising tensions with Austria (which escalated during the Austro–Russian occupation of Piedmont), Tsar Paul I became so enraged that he pulled Russia out of the Second Coalition, and the Russian troops were withdrawn. The tsar's decision to abandon the Coalition dismayed most Russian leaders.

According to the conventional view amongst historians by the 1980s, Russia's withdrawal in late 1799 was crucial to the eventual collapse of the Second Coalition and the French final victory in March 1802. However, Schroeder (1987) argued that '[t]he chances for an Austro–British victory were little worse without Russia than with it,' considering that Austria provided three-fourths of the land forces deployed to defeat France. The main effect of Russia's defection on the Coalition was that Britain could no longer control Austria's actions as it pleased, and had to deal with Vienna as an equal partner. Paul I attempted to forge a Russo–Prussian alliance in late 1799 and 1800 to punish Austria, and by January 1801 his relations with Britain had also worsened so much that he was on the brink of invading British India with 22,000 Don Cossacks. This plan did not materialise because tsar Paul I of Russia was assassinated in March 1801.

Although the French military managed to overcome the Austro–Russian expedition, it made little immediate gain from it. By the end of 1799, the Army of Italy held almost the same position as Napoleon Bonaparte had found it in 1796, except that it now also controlled Genoa. The army was in a desolate and impoverished state, with famine, lack of ammunition and horses, with bouts of desertion and mutiny as hungry soldiers sought to take food from civilians to survive. The news that Napoleon had returned to France briefly prompted morale amongst the troops to rise, as he was still popular for his victories during the 1796–97 Italian campaigns. But when the soldiers heard that Napoleon had committed the Coup of 18 Brumaire and made himself First Consul of the French Republic, French officers generally reported discontent and protests from the troops, especially from the Army of Italy which used to be under Napoleon's command, as many regarded the coup as a betrayal of the republican ideals they had been fighting for. Nevertheless, when Napoleon reassumed command, he managed to retake control of northern Italy during the Marengo campaign (April–June 1800).

Suvorov was recalled to Saint Petersburg, where he was promoted to the rank of Generalissimo, the fourth in all of Russian history. It was as a consequence of this campaign that Suvorov wrote Rules for the Conduct of Military Actions in the Mountains. He died in May 1800, having never fulfilled his greatest ambition – to meet Napoleon on the battlefield. A detailed account of the campaign was published in five volumes by Dmitry Milyutin in 1852–53. Suvorov remains vividly remembered in the parts of the Swiss Alps his army passed through. Even though his famished troops plundered the countryside bare and his campaign was ultimately fruitless, the general is venerated as a liberator from the occupying French. Plaques adorn nearly every spot where he ate or slept in the Alps; chairs and beds he used are preserved as exhibits.<ref name="BZ 2009">{{cite news|url=http://www.bernerzeitung.ch/schweiz/standard/Wie-ein-russischer-General-zum-schweizerischen-Volkshelden-wurde/story/23978465|title=Wie ein russischer General zum schweizerischen Volkshelden wurde ('How A Russian General Became A Swiss Folk Hero)|last=Nussbaumer|first=Hannes|work=Berner Zeitung|language=de|access-date=19 September 2009}}</ref> A life-size equestrian statue was unveiled in 1999 on the St. Gotthard Pass.

 List of battles 

 In art 

Notes

References

 Clausewitz, Carl von (2020). Napoleon Absent, Coalition Ascendant: The 1799 Campaign in Italy and Switzerland, Volume 1. Trans and ed. Nicholas Murray and Christopher Pringle. Lawrence, Kansas: University Press of Kansas. 
 Clausewitz, Carl von (2021). The Coalition Crumbles, Napoleon Returns: The 1799 Campaign in Italy and Switzerland, Volume 2. Trans and ed. Nicholas Murray and Christopher Pringle. Lawrence, Kansas: University Press of Kansas. 
Dmitry Milyutin. The History of the War of Russia with France during the Reign of Emperor Paul I'', vol. 1–9. St. Petersburg, 1852–1853.
 

Campaigns of the French Revolutionary Wars
Wars involving Russia
Conflicts in 1799
Conflicts in 1800
Cisalpine Republic
Alexander Suvorov